Mhuire may refer to:

Schools
 Colaiste Mhuire (disambiguation)
 Coláiste Mhuire, part of the Marino Institute of Education, affiliated with Trinity College, Dublin
 Colaiste Mhuire, Dublin
 Coláiste Mhuire, Mullingar, County Westmeath, Ireland
 Mary Immaculate College (Coláiste Mhuire gan Smál), Limerick, Ireland
 Scoil Mhuire (disambiguation)
 Scoil Mhuire, Buncrana
 Scoil Mhuire, Clane
 Scoil Mhuire, Cork
 Scoil Mhuire, Longford

Other uses
 Clann Mhuire CLG, Gaelic Athletic Association club based at Naul, County Dublin, Ireland
 Club Mhuire, the Irish Language Society in St. Mary's Grammar School, Magherafelt
 Cuan Mhuire, charitable drug, alcohol and gambling rehabilitation organisation in Ireland
 Eilean Mhuire, the most easterly of the Shiant Islands in the Outer Hebrides

See also
 Muir (disambiguation)
 Muire